St James Deeping is a former railway station which served the village of Deeping St James and town of Market Deeping in Lincolnshire, England. It was on the Lincolnshire Loop Line between Lincoln and Peterborough via Boston and Spalding. 

It was also on the Peterborough-Lincoln Line which connected Peterborough to Lincoln, avoiding Boston, via Spalding and is still an active mainline through the station site.

References

External links
 St James Deeping station on navigable 1946 O. S. map
 St James Deeping station on Disused Stations web site.  Several photographs

Disused railway stations in Lincolnshire
Former Great Northern Railway stations
Railway stations in Great Britain opened in 1849
Railway stations in Great Britain closed in 1961
1849 establishments in England